The Big Picture is the twenty-fifth studio album by English musician Elton John, released in September 1997. It includes four worldwide singles: "Live Like Horses" (a duet with Luciano Pavarotti only for the single version), "Something About the Way You Look Tonight" (released as a double A-side with "Candle in the Wind 1997"), "Recover Your Soul" and "If the River Can Bend".

Background
The album has a strong orchestral emphasis with string arrangements written by Anne Dudley and John's then backup keyboardist Guy Babylon. In 2006, John revealed in an interview that Bernie Taupin, his longtime friend and lyricist, considers this his least favourite album they have created, while John believes that to be Leather Jackets from 1986. Taupin dislikes this album because of the overall quality of his lyrical contribution and because "the production is abysmally cold and technical".

The album was dedicated to John's friend, popular fashion designer Gianni Versace, who was murdered a few months before the album's release. This was John's last album to date to be produced by Chris Thomas, who had worked with John almost nonstop since 1981's The Fox. This is the only album in which neither Davey Johnstone nor bassist Bob Birch (during his tenure as John's bassist from 1992–2012) provide backing vocals. Drummer Charlie Morgan was let go from the band shortly after the album's release and soon replaced by Curt Bisquera and John's original drummer Nigel Olsson, who remains in the lineup to this day.

Track listing
All songs written by Elton John and Bernie Taupin.

Outtakes
"Live Like Horses" was originally recorded in 1994 and intended for John's previous studio album, Made in England, but lack of time for the inclusion ruled this out. The single version of the song, released in 1996, was a duet with Luciano Pavarotti, but the song is performed solo for this album. The version with Pavarotti was later included on the bonus disc edition of John's compilation Greatest Hits 1970–2002.

"Past Imperfect" and an alternate version of "Recover Your Soul" were completed by John for inclusion on The Big Picture. Both songs have yet to see official release.

Personnel 
 Elton John – vocals, acoustic piano (all tracks), organ (1, 4, 5, 7, 8, 11)
 Guy Babylon – keyboards (1-9, 11), string arrangements 
 Paul Carrack – organ (6)
 Matthew Vaughan – keyboards (10), percussion (10)
 Davey Johnstone – guitars (all tracks)
 John Jorgenson – guitars (all tracks)
 Bob Birch – bass (all tracks)
 Charlie Morgan – drums, percussion (all tracks)
 Paul Clarvis – tabla (8)
 Anne Dudley – string arrangements and conductor 
 Carol Kenyon – backing vocals (1, 6, 8)
 Angel Voices Choir – choir (2)
 East London Gospel Choir – choir (4)
 Jackie Rowe – backing vocals (6, 8)

Production 
 Produced by Chris Thomas
 Recorded at The Townhouse, London, UK.
 Strings recorded at Air Lyndhurst, London, UK.
 Engineered by Pete Lewis
 Assistant Engineers – Andy Green, Ben Georgiades and Jay Reynolds.
 Studio Coordinators – Adrian Collee and Pete Mills
 Session Coordinators – Maureen Hillier, Ranni Lewis and Derek Mackillop.
 Management – John Reid
 Design – Rick Lecoat and Julian Schnabel 
 Painting and Still Life Photography – Julian Schnabel
 Portrait – Mario Testino

Charts

Weekly charts

Year-end charts

Certifications

References

External links

Elton John albums
1997 albums
Albums produced by Chris Thomas (record producer)
The Rocket Record Company albums